

Josef Reichert (12 December 1891 – 15 March 1970) was a German general during World War II who commanded several divisions. He was a recipient of the Knight's Cross of the Iron Cross.

Awards

 Knight's Cross of the Iron Cross on 9 December 1944 as Generalleutnant and commander of 711. Infanterie-Division

Notes

References

 

1891 births
1970 deaths
People from Berchtesgadener Land
People from the Kingdom of Bavaria
German Army personnel of World War I
Military personnel from Bavaria
Recipients of the clasp to the Iron Cross, 1st class
Recipients of the Knight's Cross of the Iron Cross
Recipients of the Order of the Crown of King Zvonimir
Lieutenant generals of the German Army (Wehrmacht)
Reichswehr personnel
German Army generals of World War II